Stéphane Diarra Badji (born 29 May 1990) is a Senegalese professional footballer who plays as a midfielder for TFF First League club Eyüpspor.

Badji moved from Senegal to Norway in 2012, signing with Sogndal. The following year, he joined SK Brann, where spent two seasons before moved to Turkish club İstanbul Başakşehir in 2014.

Club career
Badji started his career alongside his brother Ismaïla Diarra Badji in the Ècole de football Mamadou Fayé. In the winter of 2007–2008 he left the football school of Mamadou Fayé with his brother and joined to Championnat Professionnel Ligue 1 side Xam-Xam.

After a successful first professional season the Badji brothers signed in Spring 2009 with Casa Sport. On 31 December 2011, left his club Casa Sport and signed with Tippeligaen club Sogndal Fotball, without his brother who plays today with Casa Sport.

On 1 March 2013, he signed a four-year contract with Brann.

On 28 June 2019, Badji signed a contract with Ludogorets Razgrad.

On 2 February 2022, Badji signed a contract with Eyüpspor.

International career
Badji played for Senegal national under-23 football team the 2012 Summer Olympics in London. He earned his first senior cap in November 2011 and played in 2011 the UEMOA Tournament.

Career statistics

Honours
Casa Sport
 Senegal FA Cup: 2011

Ludogorets
 First Professional Football League (Bulgaria): 2019–20, 2020–21
 Bulgarian Supercup: 2019
Senegal
 UEMOA Tournament: 2011

References

External links

1990 births
Living people
Senegalese footballers
Senegal international footballers
Association football midfielders
Casa Sports players
Sogndal Fotball players
SK Brann players
Eliteserien players
R.S.C. Anderlecht players
Kayserispor footballers
Bursaspor footballers
PFC Ludogorets Razgrad players
Eyüpspor footballers
Belgian Pro League players
Süper Lig players
First Professional Football League (Bulgaria) players
TFF First League players
2011 African Nations Championship players
2011 CAF U-23 Championship players
Olympic footballers of Senegal
Footballers at the 2012 Summer Olympics
2015 Africa Cup of Nations players
ASC Xam-Xam players
İstanbul Başakşehir F.K. players
Senegalese expatriate footballers
Expatriate footballers in Norway
Expatriate footballers in Turkey
Expatriate footballers in Bulgaria
Expatriate footballers in Belgium
Senegalese expatriate sportspeople in Belgium
Senegalese expatriate sportspeople in Turkey
Senegalese expatriate sportspeople in Bulgaria
Senegalese expatriate sportspeople in Norway
People from Ziguinchor
Senegal A' international footballers